The 2019 GT Cup Open Europe was the inaugural season of the GT Cup Open Europe, the grand tourer-style sports car racing series founded by the Spanish GT Sport Organización. It began on 27 April at Le Castellet and finished on 12 October, at Monza after six double-header meetings.

Entry List

Race calendar and results 

 A six-round calendar was revealed on 2 January 2019. The schedule consisted of 6 circuits for the first year of the series with all the rounds supporting the International GT Open.

Championship standings

Points systems 
Points are awarded to the top 10 (Overall) or top 6 (Am, Pro-Am, Teams) classified finishers. If less than 6 participants start the race or if less than 75% of the original race distance is completed, half points are awarded. At the end of the season, the lowest race score is dropped; however, the dropped race cannot be the result of a disqualification or race ban.

Overall

Silver, Pro-Am, Am, and Teams

Drivers' championships

Overall

Silver

Pro-Am

Am

Teams' Championship 
Only the highest two finishing cars from a team count towards the Teams' Championship

Notes

External links 

 Official website

References 

GT Cup Open Europe seasons
GT Cup Open Europe